Ötzi, also called the Iceman, is the natural mummy of a man who lived between 3350 and 3105 BC. Ötzi was discovered in September 1991 in the Ötztal Alps (hence the nickname "Ötzi") at the border between Austria and Italy. He is Europe's oldest known natural human mummy, offering an unprecedented view of Chalcolithic (Copper Age) Europeans. 

Due to the presence of an arrowhead embedded in his left shoulder and various other wounds, researchers believe Ötzi was murdered. The nature of his life and the circumstances of his death are the subject of much investigation and speculation. His remains and personal belongings are on exhibit at the South Tyrol Museum of Archaeology in Bolzano, South Tyrol, Italy.

Discovery

When the tourists, Helmut and Erika Simon, first saw the body, they both believed that they had happened upon a recently deceased mountaineer. The next day, a mountain gendarme and the keeper of the nearby Similaunhütte first attempted to remove the body, which was frozen in ice below the torso, using a pneumatic drill and ice axes, but had to give up due to bad weather. Within a short time, eight groups visited the site, among whom were mountaineers Hans Kammerlander and Reinhold Messner.

The body was extracted on 22 September and salvaged the following day. It was transported to the office of the medical examiner in Innsbruck, together with other objects found nearby. On 24 September, the find was examined there by archaeologist Konrad Spindler of the University of Innsbruck. He dated the find to be "at least four thousand years old" on the basis of the typology of an axe among the retrieved objects. Tissue samples from the corpse and other accompanying materials were later analyzed at several scientific institutions and their results unequivocally concluded that the remains belonged to someone who had lived between 3359 and 3105 BCE, or some 5,000 years ago. More specific estimates stated that there was a 66% chance he died between 3239 and 3105 BC, a 33% chance he died between 3359 and 3294 BC, and a 1% chance he died between 3277 and 3268 BC.

Border dispute 
At the Treaty of Saint-Germain-en-Laye of 1919, the border between North and South Tyrol was defined as the watershed of the rivers Inn and Etsch. Near Tisenjoch, the glacier (which has since retreated) complicated establishing the watershed and the border was drawn too far north. Although Ötzi's find site drains to the Austrian side, surveys in October 1991 showed that the body had been located  inside Italian territory as delineated in 1919. The province of South Tyrol claimed property rights but agreed to let Innsbruck University finish its scientific examinations. Since 1998, it has been on display at the South Tyrol Museum of Archaeology in Bolzano, the capital of South Tyrol.

Scientific analyses
The corpse has been extensively examined, measured, X-rayed, and dated. Tissues and intestinal contents have been examined microscopically, as have the items found with the body. In August 2004, frozen bodies of three Austro-Hungarian soldiers killed during the Battle of San Matteo (1918) were found on the mountain Punta San Matteo in Trentino. One body was sent to a museum in the hope that research on how the environment affected its preservation would help unravel Ötzi's past.

Body

Because the body was covered in ice shortly after his death, it had only partially deteriorated. Initial reports claimed that his penis and most of his scrotum were missing, but this was later shown to be unfounded. Analysis of pollen, dust grains and the isotopic composition of his tooth enamel indicates that he spent his childhood near the present South Tyrol village of Feldthurns, north of Bolzano, but later went to live in valleys about  farther north.

In 2009, a CAT scan revealed that the stomach had shifted upward to where his lower lung area would normally be. Analysis of the contents revealed the partly digested remains of ibex meat, confirmed by DNA analysis, suggesting he had a meal less than two hours before his death. Wheat grains were also found. It is believed that Ötzi most likely had a few slices of a dried, fatty meat, probably bacon, which came from a wild goat in South Tyrol, Italy. Analysis of Ötzi's intestinal contents showed two meals (the last one consumed about eight hours before his death), one of chamois meat, the other of red deer and herb bread; both were eaten with roots and fruits. The grain also eaten with both meals was a highly processed einkorn wheat bran, quite possibly eaten in the form of bread. In the proximity of the body, and thus possibly originating from the Iceman's provisions, chaff and grains of einkorn and barley, and seeds of flax and poppy were discovered, as well as kernels of sloes (small plum-like fruits of the blackthorn tree) and various seeds of berries growing in the wild.

Hair analysis was used to examine his diet from several months before. Pollen in the first meal showed that it had been consumed in a mid-altitude conifer forest, and other pollens indicated the presence of wheat and legumes, which may have been domesticated crops. Pollen grains of hop-hornbeam were also discovered. The pollen was very well preserved, with the cells inside remaining intact, indicating that it had been fresh (estimated about two hours old) at the time of Ötzi's death, which places the event in the spring or early summer. Einkorn wheat is harvested in the late summer, and sloes in the autumn; these must have been stored from the previous year.

High levels of both copper particles and arsenic were found in Ötzi's hair. This, along with Ötzi's copper axe blade, which is 99.7% pure copper, has led scientists to speculate that Ötzi was involved in copper smelting.

By examining the proportions of Ötzi's tibia, femur, and pelvis, it was postulated that Ötzi's lifestyle included long walks over hilly terrain. This degree of mobility is not characteristic of other Copper Age Europeans. This may indicate that Ötzi was a high-altitude shepherd.

Using modern 3D scanning technology, a facial reconstruction has been created for the South Tyrol Museum of Archaeology in Bolzano, Italy. It shows Ötzi looking old for his 45 years, with deep-set brown eyes, a beard, a furrowed face, and sunken cheeks. He is depicted as looking tired and ungroomed.

Health
Ötzi apparently had Trichuris trichiura (whipworm), an intestinal parasite. During CT scans, it was observed that three or four of his right ribs had been cracked when he had been lying face down after death, or where the ice had crushed his body. One of his fingernails (of the two found) shows three Beau's lines indicating he was sick three times in the six months before he died. The last incident, two months before he died, lasted about two weeks. It was also found that his epidermis, the outer skin layer, was missing, a natural process from his mummification in ice. Ötzi's teeth showed considerable internal deterioration from cavities. These oral pathologies may have been brought about by his grain-heavy, high carbohydrate diet. DNA analysis in February 2012 revealed that Ötzi was lactose intolerant, supporting the theory that lactose intolerance was still common at that time, despite the increasing spread of agriculture and dairying.

Skeletal details and tattooing
Ötzi had a total of 61 tattoos, consisting of 19 groups of black lines ranging from 1 to 3 mm in thickness and 7 to 40 mm long. These include groups of parallel lines running along the longitudinal axis of his body and to both sides of the lumbar spine, as well as a cruciform mark behind the right knee and on the right ankle, and parallel lines around the left wrist. The greatest concentration of markings is found on his legs, which together exhibit 12 groups of lines. A microscopic examination of samples collected from these tattoos revealed that they were created from pigment manufactured out of fireplace ash or soot. This pigment was then rubbed into small linear incisions or punctures. It has been suggested that Ötzi has been repeatedly tattooed in the same locations, since the majority of them are quite dark.

Radiological examination of Ötzi's bones showed "age-conditioned or strain-induced degeneration" corresponding to many tattooed areas, including osteochondrosis and slight spondylosis in the lumbar spine and wear-and-tear degeneration in the knee and especially in the ankle joints. It has been speculated that these tattoos may have been related to pain relief treatments similar to acupressure or acupuncture. If so, this is at least 2,000 years before their previously known earliest use in China (c. 1000 BC). It has been shown that 9 out of the 19 groups of his tattoos are located next to, or directly on acupunctural areas that are used today. The majority of the other tattoos are on meridians, other acupunctural areas of the body, or over arthritic joints. For example, the tattoos on his upper chest are placed on acupunctural locations that are thought to help with abdominal pain. Since it is presumed Ötzi had whipworm, which would cause said intestinal pain, such tattoos could have helped him feel some relief, which supports the theory that they were used for therapeutic purposes.

At one point, it was thought that Ötzi was the oldest tattooed human mummy yet discovered. In 2018, however, tattoos were discovered on nearly contemporaneous Egyptian mummies.

Many of Ötzi's tattoos originally went unnoticed since they are difficult to see with the naked eye. In 2015, researchers photographed the body using noninvasive multispectral techniques to capture images on different light wavelengths that are imperceptible by humans, revealing the remainder of his tattoos.

Clothes and shoes

Ötzi wore a cloak made of woven grass and a coat, a belt, a pair of leggings, a loincloth and shoes, all made of leather of different skins. He also wore a bearskin cap with a leather chin strap. The shoes were waterproof and wide, seemingly designed for walking across the snow; they were constructed using bearskin for the soles, deer hide for the top panels, and a netting made of tree bark. Soft grass went around the foot and in the shoe and functioned like modern socks. The coat, belt, leggings and loincloth were constructed of vertical strips of leather sewn together with sinew. His belt had a pouch sewn to it that contained a cache of useful items: a scraper, drill, flint flake, bone awl and a dried fungus (see 'Tools and equipment' below).

The shoes have since been reproduced by a Czech academic, who said that "because the shoes are actually quite complex, I'm convinced that even 5,300 years ago, people had the equivalent of a cobbler who made shoes for other people". The reproductions were found to constitute such excellent footwear that it was reported that a Czech company offered to purchase the rights to sell them. However, a more recent hypothesis by British archaeologist Jacqui Wood says that Ötzi's shoes were actually the upper part of snowshoes. According to this theory, the item currently interpreted as part of a backpack is actually the wood frame and netting of one snowshoe and animal hide to cover the face.

The leather loincloth and hide coat were made from sheepskin. Genetic analysis showed that the sheep species was nearer to modern domestic European sheep than to wild sheep; the items were made from the skins of at least four animals. Part of the coat was made from domesticated goat belonging to a mitochondrial haplogroup (a common female ancestor) that inhabits central Europe today. The coat was made from several animals from two different species and was stitched together using hides. The leggings were made from domesticated goat leather. A similar set of 5,000-year-old leggings discovered in Schnidejoch, Switzerland were made from goat leather as well.

Shoelaces were made from the European genetic population of cattle. The quiver was made from wild roe deer,  the fur hat was made from a genetic lineage of brown bear which lives in the region today. Writing in the journal Scientific Reports, researchers from Ireland and Italy reported their analysis of his clothing's mitochondrial DNA, which was extracted from nine fragments from six of his garments, including his loin cloth and fur cap.

Tools and equipment

Other items found with the Iceman were a copper axe with a yew handle, a chert-bladed knife with an ash handle and a quiver of 14 arrows with viburnum and dogwood shafts. Two of the arrows, which were broken, were tipped with flint and had fletching (stabilizing fins), while the other 12 were unfinished and untipped. The arrows were found in a quiver with what is presumed to be a bow string, an unidentified tool, and an antler tool which might have been used for sharpening arrow points.

In addition, among Ötzi's possessions were berries, two birch bark baskets, and two species of polypore mushrooms with leather strings through them. One of these, the birch fungus, is known to have anthelmintic properties, and was probably used for medicinal purposes. The other was a type of tinder fungus, included with part of what appeared to be a complex firelighting kit. The kit featured pieces of over a dozen different plants, in addition to flint and pyrite for creating sparks.

Ötzi's copper axe was of particular interest. Despite the fact that copper ore sources in the Alpines are known to have been exploited at the time, a study indicated that the copper in the axe came from southern Tuscany. It was let into the forked end of the crook and fixed there using birch-tar and tight leather lashing. The blade part of the head extends out of the lashing and shows clear signs of having been used to chop and cut. At the time, such an axe would have been a valuable possession, important both as a tool and as a status symbol for the bearer.

Genetic analysis
Ötzi's full genome has been sequenced; the report on this was published on 28 February 2012. The Y chromosome DNA of Ötzi belongs to a subclade of G defined by the SNPs M201, P287, P15, L223 and L91 (G-L91, ISOGG G2a2b, former "G2a4"). He was not typed for any of the subclades downstreaming from G-L91; however, an analysis of his BAM file revealed that he belongs to the L166 and FGC5672 subclades below L91. G-L91 is now mostly found in South Corsica.

Analysis of his mitochondrial DNA showed that Ötzi belongs to the K1 subclade, but cannot be categorized into any of the three modern branches of that subclade (K1a, K1b, or K1c). The new subclade has provisionally been named K1ö for Ötzi. A multiplex assay study was able to confirm that the Iceman's mtDNA belongs to a previously unknown European mtDNA clade with a very limited distribution among modern data sets.

By autosomal DNA, Ötzi is most closely related to Southern Europeans, especially to geographically isolated populations like Corsicans and Sardinians. He was part of the migration of early European farmers who migrated from Anatolia to Europe in large numbers during the 7th millennium BC, replacing earlier Europe's hunter-gatherers.

DNA analysis also showed him at high risk of atherosclerosis and lactose intolerance, with the presence of the DNA sequence of Borrelia burgdorferi, possibly making him the earliest known human with Lyme disease. A later analysis suggested the sequence may have been a different Borrelia species.

In October 2013, it was reported that 19 modern Tyrolean men were descendants of Ötzi or of a close relative of Ötzi. Scientists from the Institute of Legal Medicine at Innsbruck Medical University had analysed the DNA of over 3,700 Tyrolean male blood donors and found 19 who shared a particular genetic mutation with the 5,300-year-old man.

Blood
In May 2012, scientists announced the discovery that Ötzi still had intact blood cells. These are the oldest complete human blood cells ever identified. In most bodies this old, the blood cells are either shrunken or mere remnants, but Ötzi's have the same dimensions as living red blood cells and resembled a modern-day sample.

H. pylori analysis
In 2016, researchers reported on a study from the extraction of twelve samples from the gastrointestinal tract of Ötzi to analyze the origins of the Helicobacter pylori in his gut. The H. pylori strain found in his gastrointestinal tract was, surprisingly, the hpAsia2 strain, a strain today found primarily in South Asian and Central Asian populations, with extremely rare occurrences in modern European populations.  The strain found in Ötzi's gut is most similar to three modern individuals from Northern India; the strain itself is, of course, older than the modern Northern Indian strain.

Stomach 
Ötzi's stomach was completely full and its contents were mostly undigested. In 2018, researchers performed a thorough analysis of his stomach and intestines to gain insights on Chalcolithic meal composition and dietary habits. Biopsies were performed on the stomach to obtain dietary information in the time leading up to his death, and the contents themselves were also analyzed. Previously, Ötzi was believed to be vegetarian, but during this study it was revealed that his diet was omnivorous. The presence of certain compounds suggests what kinds of food he generally ate, such as gamma-terpinene implying the intake of herbs, and several nutritious minerals indicating red meat or dairy consumption. Through analysis of DNA and protein traces, the researchers were able to identify the contents of Ötzi's last meal, composed of fat and meat from ibex and red deer as well as einkorn wheat. The results of atomic force microscopy and Raman spectroscopy analysis reveal that he consumed fresh or dried wild meat. A previous study detected charcoal particles in his lower intestine which indicate that fire was present during some part of the food preparation process, but it was likely used in drying out the meat or smoking it.

Cause of death

The cause of death remained uncertain until 10 years after the discovery of the body. It was initially believed that Ötzi died from exposure during a winter storm. Later it was speculated that Ötzi might have been a victim of a ritual sacrifice, perhaps for being a chieftain. This explanation was inspired by theories previously advanced for the first millennium BC bodies recovered from peat bogs such as the Tollund Man and the Lindow Man.

Arrowhead and blood analyses 
In 2001, X-rays and a CT scan revealed that Ötzi had an arrowhead lodged in his left shoulder when he died and a matching small tear on his coat. The discovery of the arrowhead prompted researchers to theorize Ötzi died of blood loss from the wound, which would probably have been fatal even if modern medical techniques had been available. Further research found that the arrow's shaft had been removed before death, and close examination of the body found bruises and cuts to the hands, wrists and chest and cerebral trauma indicative of a blow to the head. One of the cuts was to the base of his thumb that reached down to the bone but had no time to heal before his death. Currently, it is believed that Ötzi bled to death after the arrow shattered the scapula and damaged nerves and blood vessels before lodging near the lung.

DNA analyses taken in 2003 are claimed to have revealed traces of blood from at least four other people on his gear: one from his knife, two from a single arrowhead in his quiver, and a fourth from his coat. Interpretations of these findings were that Ötzi killed two people with the same arrow and was able to retrieve it on both occasions, and the blood on his coat was from a wounded comrade he may have carried over his back. Ötzi's posture in death (frozen body, face down, left arm bent across the chest) could support a theory that before death occurred and rigor mortis set in, the Iceman was turned onto his stomach in the effort to remove the arrow shaft. The Cambridge World History of Violence (2020) cited Ötzi as evidence of prehistoric warfare.

Alternate theory of death location 
Most research has assumed that Otzi died roughly on the spot where he was found. In 2010, it was proposed that Ötzi died at a much lower altitude and was buried higher in the mountains, as posited by archaeologist Alessandro Vanzetti of the Sapienza University of Rome and his colleagues. According to their study of the items found near Ötzi and their locations, it is possible that the iceman may have been placed above what has been interpreted as a stone burial mound but was subsequently moved with each thaw cycle that created a flowing watery mix driven by gravity before being re-frozen. While archaeobotanist Klaus Oeggl of the University of Innsbruck agrees that the natural process described probably caused the body to move from the ridge that includes the stone formation, he pointed out that the paper provided no compelling evidence to demonstrate that the scattered stones constituted a burial platform. Moreover, biological anthropologist Albert Zink argues that the iceman's bones display no dislocations that would have resulted from a downhill slide and that the intact blood clots in his arrow wound would show damage if the body had been moved up the mountain. In either case, the burial theory does not contradict the possibility of a violent cause of death.

Legal dispute

Italian law entitled the Simons to a finders' fee from the South Tyrolean provincial government of 25% of the value of Ötzi. In 1994 the authorities offered a "symbolic" reward of Lire 10 million (€5,200), which the Simons declined. In 2003, the Simons filed a lawsuit which asked a court in Bolzano to recognize their role in Ötzi's discovery and declare them his "official discoverers". The court decided in the Simons' favor in November 2003, and at the end of December that year the Simons announced that they were seeking US$300,000 as their fee. The provincial government decided to appeal.

In addition, two people came forward to claim that they were part of the same mountaineering party that came across Ötzi and discovered the body first:
 Magdalena Mohar Jarc, a retired Slovenian climber, who alleged that she discovered the corpse first after falling into a crevice, and shortly after returning to a mountain hut, asked Helmut Simon to take photographs of Ötzi. She cited Reinhold Messner, who was also present in the mountain hut, as the witness to this.
 Sandra Nemeth, from Switzerland, who contended that she found the corpse before Helmut and Erika Simon, and that she spat on Ötzi to make sure that her DNA would be found on the body later. She asked for a DNA test on the remains, but experts believed that there was little chance of finding any trace.

In 2005 the rival claims were heard by a Bolzano court. The legal case angered Mrs. Simon, who alleged that neither woman was present on the mountain that day. In 2005, Mrs. Simon's lawyer said: "Mrs. Simon is very upset by all this and by the fact that these two new claimants have decided to appear 14 years after Ötzi was found." In 2008, however, Jarc stated for a Slovene newspaper that she wrote twice to the Bolzano court in regard to her claim but received no reply whatsoever.

In 2004, Helmut Simon died. Two years later, in June 2006, an appeals court affirmed that the Simons had indeed discovered the Iceman and were therefore entitled to a finder's fee. It also ruled that the provincial government had to pay the Simons' legal costs. After this ruling, Mrs. Erika Simon reduced her claim to €150,000. The provincial government's response was that the expenses it had incurred to establish a museum and the costs of preserving the Iceman should be considered in determining the finder's fee. It insisted it would pay no more than €50,000. In September 2006, the authorities appealed the case to Italy's highest court, the Court of Cassation.

On 29 September 2008 it was announced that the provincial government and Mrs. Simon had reached a settlement of the dispute, under which she would receive €150,000 in recognition of Ötzi's discovery by her and her late husband and the tourist income that it attracts.

See also 

 Big Mama stela – inscription possibly associated with Ötzi's culture
 Iceman – a 2017 fictional film about the life of Ötzi
 List of unsolved murders
 Similar archaeological finds:
 Children of Llullaillaco and Mummy Juanita – high-altitude Incan mummies
 Gebelein predynastic mummies – roughly contemporaneous Egyptian mummies
 Saltmen – well-preserved Iranian mummies
 Tarim Basin Mummies – well-preserved Central Asian mummies

References

Further reading

Articles
 .
 .
 .
 .
 .
 . On-line pre-publication version.

Books
 
 .
 .
 .

External links 

 Official website about Ötzi
 New insights into the Tyrolean Iceman's origin and phenotype as inferred by whole-genome sequencing
 Iceman Photoscan, published by EURAC Research, Institute for Mummies and the Iceman
 "Death of the Iceman" – a synopsis of a BBC Horizon TV documentary first broadcast on 7 February 2002
 Ötzi Links ... Der Mann aus dem Eis vom Hauslabjoch – a list of links to websites about Ötzi in English, German and Italian (last updated 28 January 2006)
 Otzi, the 5,300 Year Old Iceman from the Alps: Pictures & Information (last updated 27 October 2004)
 "Five millennia on, Iceman of Bolzano gives up DNA secrets" Michael Day, The Independent, 2 August 2010
 "The Iceman Mummy: Finally Face to Face High definition image of a reconstruction of Ötzi's face.
 "An Ice Cold Case" RadioLab interviews Albert Zink, Head of EURAC Research and the scientist in charge of Ötzi research.
 "Ötzi's Shoes

1991 archaeological discoveries
1991 in Austria
1991 in Italy
1991 in science
4th-millennium BC deaths
Archaeological artifacts
Archaeological discoveries in Italy
Copper Age Europe
Curses
History of the Alps
Mummies
People from South Tyrol